Esteros is a small town in the Altamira Municipality in Tamaulipas, Mexico. According to the 2005 INGI population estimate it had a population of 2,132. Esteros is located at  (22.5201686, -98.1271362).

References 

Populated places in Tamaulipas